Lustig-Prean and Beckett v United Kingdom (2000) 29 ECHR 548 is a UK labour law and European Convention on Human Rights case on sexual orientation discrimination. The European Court of Human Rights combined judgments for Beckett, Grady, Lustig-Prean and Smith are regarded as pivotal in gay rights throughout the UK and Europe.

Facts
Duncan Lustig-Prean (born 6 March 1959) is a retired officer of the Royal Navy. In 1994 he was dismissed from the Royal Navy when it became known that he was gay. He then joined Rank Outsiders, who were campaigning for the right of gay men and lesbians to serve in the armed forces.

John Beckett, a former Royal Navy Weapons Engineer was dismissed in 1993 for being gay following personal disclosure to a military chaplain.

Lustig-Prean and Beckett alleged that their dismissal, together with the intrusive nature of the investigations conducted by the Military Police into their sexuality, violated their right to privacy under Article 8 ECHR. Duncan Lustig-Prean and John Beckett alongside Jeanette Smith and Graeme Grady brought a case against the UK – Lustig-Prean and Beckett v the United Kingdom – in the European Court of Human Rights. In 1999 the Court found in their favour, as a result of which the Government suspended dismissals on the grounds of homosexuality, and subsequently changed the law.

Judgment
The European Court of Human Rights held that the Article 8 rights of Lustig-Prean and Beckett had been breached. The UK government immediately suspended discharging homosexuals and within months had changed the law. An ECHR judgement applies to all signatory nations of the convention.

References

See also
UK employment discrimination law
UK labour law
Human Rights Act 1998

Article 8 of the European Convention on Human Rights
United Kingdom labour case law
United Kingdom equality case law
European Court of Human Rights cases involving the United Kingdom
1999 in case law
1999 in British law
United Kingdom LGBT rights case law
1999 in LGBT history